Diana Campbell Betancourt is an American curator working in South and Southeast Asia, primarily Bangladesh and the Philippines. Currently she is the artistic director of Dhaka-based Samdani Art Foundation and chief curator of the Dhaka Art Summit. Formerly based in Mumbai for six years, she facilitated inter-regional South Asia dialog through her exhibitions and public programmes.

Career 
Campbell Betancourt's focus is inter-Asia dialog and can be seen through her exhibitions and public programmes. She chairs the board of the Mumbai Art Room, has been a research fellow at the Henry Moore Institute, the Fukuoka Asian Art Museum and the FRAC Champagne-Ardenne, and has collaborated with sculpture parks including Yorkshire Sculpture Park, de Cordova, and Wanas Konst on commissions of Indian sculpture.
She has consulted the New Museum and MCA Chicago and many other leading institutions on their inclusion of South Asia in their exhibitions programs and has presented and published her research as part of MoMA's C-MAP initiative.
She was a nominee for the 2016 Independent Curators International Independent Vision Curatorial Award and participated in MoMA's 2016 International Curatorial Institute, and gave the 2016 Key Note Lecture for Artspace Sydney's International Visiting Curators programme. Her work developing the Bangladeshi art scene with patrons Nadia and Rajeeb Samdani was recognized on the 2019 ArtReview Power100 list  and the 2020 list recognizes them as number 41 on a list of the 100 most influential figures and movements in the art world.[.

Campbell Betancourt was appointed the curator of Frieze Projects for Frieze London 2018 and 2019 – overseeing the artist award commission by Alex Baczinski-Jenkins and Himali Singh Soin, the Film Program, and LIVE.

 Dhaka Art Summit and Samdani Art Foundation 

Diana Campbell Betancourt has developed the Dhaka Art Summit to be the world's leading research and exhibitions platform for art from South Asia, and developed a new philanthropic platform to shift the discourse away from an Indo-centric one by bringing together artists, architects, curators, and writers from across South Asia and through a largely commission based model where new work and exhibitions are born in Bangladesh. She has curated numerous solo projects with artists such as Raqib Shaw (co-curated with Maria Balshaw) Haroon Mirza, Simryn Gill, Tino Sehgal, Lynda Benglis, Shilpa Gupta, Shahzia Sikander, Naeem Mohaiemen, Runa Islam, Shumon Ahmed, Pawel Althamer, Asim Waqif, and Raqs Media Collective as well as group exhibitions such as Rewind (with Amara Antilla, Sabih Ahmed, and Beth Citron)), Mining Warm Data, The Asian Art Biennale in Context and Bearing Points and initiated a free, alternative education program called Samdani Seminars and Education Pavilion which bridges the gaps in curriculum between the various art schools in Dhaka with international guest faculty. Campbell Betanourt has conceived of the Dhaka Art Summit as a cumulative event, stressing that it is 'not about the individual editions; it is a continuation, and it always builds on the last one'. She also added a scholarly element to the platform from the 2018 edition, developing a transnational think tank connecting modern art histories in and across Africa, South and Southeast Asia in collaboration with the Getty Foundation, Cornell University Center for Comparative Modernities, the Asia Art Archive, and the Samdani Art Foundation which convened in Hong Kong and Dhaka in 2019 and 2020.

In addition to her exhibitions making practice, Betancourt is also responsible for developing the Samdani Art Foundation collection, which has been recognized by ArtReview, Artnet News, Artnet News, and Artnews as one of the leading collections in the world. The collection, as well as temporary exhibitions related to it, will be visible in the foundation's art centre.

 Bellas Artes Projects 

From 2016 to 2018, Campbell Betancourt served as the founding artistic director of Bellas Artes Projects – a production based residency program and exhibition space in Bagac, Bataan and Manila, Philippines under the patronage of Jam Acuzar. She produced and curated critically acclaimed exhibitions by Carlos Amorales, Isabel and Alfredo Aquilizan, Cian Dayrit, Stefanos Tsivopoulos, as well as the first major solo exhibition in Asia of the late American artist Bruce Conner.

Education 
Diana Campbell Betancourt studied at Princeton University in the United States, graduating in 2006. Her study concentration included Chinese language and culture, economics, and finance.

References 

Year of birth missing (living people)
Living people
American art curators
American women curators
American expatriates in Bangladesh
American expatriates in the Philippines
21st-century American women